Shades State Park is a state park in Montgomery, Parke, and Fountain Counties in Indiana. In 2018–2019, Shades received nearly 87,000 visitors.

The park is 1 of 14 Indiana State Parks that are in the path of totality for the 2024 solar eclipse, with the park experiencing 49 seconds of totality.

History
In the last decades of the 19th century, the area was a resort with a forty-room inn. In the 1930s a man named Joseph Frisz acquired the land in order to protect it and purchased more land around. His heirs sold the land in 1947 to the holding company "Save the Shades", who in turn gave the land to the state to create Indiana's 15th state park.

Originally, the area was known as the "Shades of Death".  There is debate as to why it got that name.  Some say it was due to the way the trees cast their shadow on the ground below, making it look like a black forest.  Others say it was because of a settler's death, although details are unclear and contradictory.

Features
Steep sandstone cliffs within the park were formed when Indiana was covered by ocean hundreds of millions of years ago. Fossils can be found on the nearby sandbars.

Sugar Creek, which runs through the park, is too unsafe for swimming, but canoeing is available. The two parks share similar features including steep ravines, slate and sandstone valleys, and small waterfalls.

The Silver Cascade waterfall is small, but unique, in that it is a convex waterfall. An excellent view of it and nearby Sugar Creek can be had from Lover's Leap, a small observation deck built out over the cliff.

Indiana State Road 234 winds through the park, though not signed as such. It has much lower speed limits than a State highway normally would, due to its narrow width in some places and hairpin turns in others.

Shades is also notable for having a small airfield called Roscoe Turner Flight Strip, where visitors once could land their plane and then visit the park. No other state park has this feature. The airfield is closed and it is not known whether it will ever reopen.

Pine Hills Nature Preserve

Located in the eastern end of the state park, the  Pine Hills Nature Preserve protects the deep canyons formed by Indian Creek before it enters Sugar Creek. The primary feature in the preserve is the "Devils Backbone," a 100-foot-high stone ridge barely wide enough for the trail to cross. The preserve was the first dedicated nature preserve in Indiana, and was designated a National Natural Landmark in 1968 under the name "Pine Hills Natural Area."

Gallery

References

 My Indiana: 101 Places to See, by Earl L. Conn (Indiana Historical Society Press, 2006). pg.126-7.

External links
 Shades State Park

State parks of Indiana
Protected areas of Fountain County, Indiana
Protected areas of Montgomery County, Indiana
Protected areas of Parke County, Indiana
Canyons and gorges of Indiana
Protected areas established in 1947
National Natural Landmarks in Indiana
1947 establishments in Indiana
Waterfalls of Indiana
Landforms of Fountain County, Indiana
Landforms of Parke County, Indiana